Józef Oleszkiewicz (c.1777, in Šiluva – 5 October 1830, in Saint Petersburg) was a Polish-Lithuanian painter, known primarily for his portraits and his eccentric behavior.

Biography 

Oleszkiewicz came from an impoverished noble family; his father was a musician. With assistance from a family friend, he became a student at the University of Vilnius in 1797. He studied anatomy and physiology but switched to drawing and painting, taking classes with Franciszek Smuglewicz and Jan Rustem. He also copied paintings at the homes of wealthy people who knew his family. In 1801, he attracted the attention of Count Aleksander Chodkiewicz, a playwright, chemist and (later) a general, who was also a budding patron of the arts. Chodkiewicz provided him with the necessary funds to study abroad.

In 1803, he went to Paris and enrolled at the École des Beaux-Arts, where he studied with Jean-Simon Berthélemy and Jacques-Louis David. He returned to Vilnius in 1806 and had great success with several historical paintings at an exhibition there in 1809.

After failing to obtain a Professorship at the university, he went to Saint Petersburg. His painting of Tsarina Maria Feodorovna providing for the poor won him the title of "Academician" from the Imperial Academy of Arts in 1812. Oleszkiewicz soon became a much sought-after portrait painter, but he also created historical, religious and allegorical works.

In regard to the latter, he was a prominent Freemason, eventually becoming part of the upper hierarchy at the lodges in Saint Petersburg and Vilnius, until they were outlawed in 1822. His interests extended to theosophy, mysticism and the paranormal. He was also a vegetarian and an early advocate of animal rights, lived in a house full of cats, and gave most of his large income to the poor, in person. After predicting what would be the worst flood in Saint Petersburg's history, in 1824, he gained a reputation as a soothsayer, although floods there were certainly not uncommon. Later, he was the inspiration for "The Sorcerer"; a character who appears in Part III of the poetic drama Dziady by Adam Mickiewicz.

Despite being a vegetarian, it appears that he died from complications related to gout.

Selected portraits

References

Further reading 
Memories of Oleszkiewicz by Osip Antonovich Przhetslavsky (a government censor and author of a work called "The Great Secret of the Freemasons"), from Русская старина (Russian Antiquity) 1876, Vol. 16, #7

External links

"Artysta, nihilista, mistyk i prorok, bohater" (Artist, Nihilist, Mystic, Prophet, Hero) by Alwida Bajor. Oleszkiewicz and his relationship to Mickiewicz, from Magazyn Wileński.  
An appreciation by Boris Krepak from Культура (in Belarusian)

1777 births
1830 deaths
19th-century Polish painters
19th-century male artists from the Russian Empire
Russian painters
Russian male painters
Polish emigrants to Russia
Portrait painters
Russian Freemasons
Lithuanian people of Polish descent
People from Raseiniai District Municipality
Vilnius University alumni
École des Beaux-Arts alumni
Polish male painters